Énée et Lavinie is the title of two French operas:
Énée et Lavinie (1690) by Pascal Collasse
Énée et Lavinie (1758) by Antoine Dauvergne